Narayan Gangopadhyay (4 February 1918 – 8 November 1970), also known as Narayan Ganguly, was an Indian novelist, poet, essayist, and short story writer, and one of the leading writers of modern Bengali literature. He introduced the endearing character of Tenida in his famous stories of Children's literature. He took up "Narayan" as his pen name. He married his brother in law's niece Renuka Devi, with whom he had his only daughter Basabi(Bani). His wife Renuka Ganguly and daughter Basabi Roy Chowdhury were also eminent writers and teachers. Renuka Ganguly died on 10 February 2010 whereas, Basabi Roy Chowdhury recently died on 17 December 2021, and was survived by 6 children, and grandchildren.

He was awarded the literary awards Basumati Literary Prize (1968).

Life
Narayan Gangopadhyay was born as Taraknath Gangopadhyay in Baliadingi in Dinjapur district of Bengal in 1918. His paternal side had their roots in the village of Basudebpara, Nalchira in Gournadi thana of Barisal district. His father, Pramathnath Gangopadhyay, was a police officer. Because his father would be transferred often, he studied in Dinajpur, Faridpur, Barisal and Kolkata. Narayan Gangopadhyay matriculated from Dinajpur Zila School in 1933. He then took admission at Rajendra College in Faridpur but had to leave the town on 1 May 1935 on political grounds. He was interned as a 'revolutionary suspect' and could not appear in the college examinations. Later he took admission in the second year at B M College in Barisal and passed Intermediate Arts (IA) as a non-collegiate candidate in 1936. He passed the Bachelor of Arts with distinction from the same college in 1938. Famous poet Jibanananda Das was his teacher there. In 1941, he completed the MA from the University of Calcutta, receiving the Brahmamayee Gold Medal for his outstanding results. He earned DPhil from the same university in 1960, for his research in the field of short stories in Bengali literature.

Narayan Gangopadhyay taught at a number of colleges, including Ananda Chandra College, Jalpaiguri (1942–45) and the City College, Kolkata (1945–1955). He started teaching at the University of Calcutta in 1956. His students were the famous actor Soumitra Chatterjee and novelist Sunil Gangopadhyay and Samaresh Majumdar.

Works
Narayan Gangopadhyay began writing poetry while still a student. In due course he became famous for his short stories, novels, plays etc. Narayan Gangopadhyay's first story was published in 'Bichitra'. He was a romantic writer.
His novels include Upanibesh (3 volumes, 1944–1947), Samrat O Shresthi (1944), Mandramukhar (1945), Shilalipi (1949), Lalmati (1951), Krishnapaksa (1951), Baitalik (1955), and Asidhara (1957). His volumes of short stories include Trophy (1949), Bitangsa, Janmantar, Bhangabandar, Duhshasan, Bhatiyali (1957), Exhibition, Chhayatari, Ghurni, and Aleyar Rat. Among his other works are several volumes of essays: Sahitya O Sahityik, Sahitye Chhotagalpa (1955), Kathakobid Rabindranath (1965), and Chhotagalper Simarekha (1969). He also wrote stories for children, among them, Saptakanda, Andhakarer Agantuk, Chotader Shrestha Galpa (1952), Chhutir Akash, Khushir Hawa, Jhau Banglor Rahasya, Panchananer Hati, Pataldangar Tenida, Galpa Bali Galpa Shona, Abyartha Laksyabhed, Tenidar Abhiyan (1941). Bhadate Chai and Agantuk were two of his widely acclaimed plays. He also wrote a few screenplays and songs for films and gramophone records.

Narayan Gangopadhyay was a regular contributor to Shanibarer Chithi. Towards the end of his life, he used to write regularly for the weekly Desh under the pen name 'Sunanda'. His writings are informed by his historical sense and patriotic feelings as well as his love for the nature of Bengal. His short stories were highly acclaimed, and he was awarded the Ananda Award (1964) in recognition of his contribution to Bengali literature. The weekly Basumati accorded him a reception in 1968. Narayan Gangopadhyay died on 6 November 1970 in Kolkata.

Novels
 Uponibesh-1 (উপনিবেশ -১)
 Uponibesh-2 (উপনিবেশ -২)
 Uponibesh-3 (উপনিবেশ -৩)
 Somrat O Sreshthi (সম্রাট ও শ্রেষ্ঠী)
 Mantramukhar (মন্ত্রমুখর)
 Mohananda    (মহানন্দা)
 Swarnaseeta  (স্বর্ণসীতা)
 Nishijapon (নিশিযাপন)
 Trophy       (ট্রফি)
 Lalmati      (লালমাটি)
 Krishnapakkha(কৃষ্ণপক্ষ)
 Bidushok     (বিদূষক)
 Boitalik
 Shilalipi   (শিলালিপি)
 Oshidhara   (অসিধারা)
 Vatiali
 Podoshonchar   (পদসঞ্চার)
 Amabossar Gan
 Alokporna   (আলোকপর্ণা)

Short Stories
 Golposongroho
 Saper Mathay Moni
 Sreshto Golpo
 Swanirbachito Golpo

Dramas
 Bhim Badh
 Varate Chai
 Agontuk
 Porer Upokar Korio Na (Tenida series)

Satire
 Sunandar Journal

Essays
 Sahitye Chotogolpo
 Bangla Golpo Bichitra
 Chotogolper Shimarekha
 Kothakobid Rabindranath

Children literature
 Charmurti (Filmed as Charmurti in 1978)
 Charmurtir Abhijan
 Abyartha Lokhyobhed Ebong (not a Tenida story)
 Jhaubanglar Rohosyo
 Kombol Niruddesh
 Tenida o Sindhughotok
 Porer Upokar Korio na (Drama)
 Tenida Somogro
 Rammohan (Biography of Raja Rammohan Roy)
 Samagra Kishore Sahitya

See also
 List of Indian writers

References

External links
 
 
 Gangopadhyay, Narayan at the West Bengal Public Library Network
 Short story "The Bait" (translated).
 Thesis on short stories of Narayan Gongopadhyay
 Sunday Suspense Stories of Narayan Gongopadhyay
 Tenida Samagra by Narayan Gongopadhyay

1918 births
1970 deaths
Bengali writers
Bengali-language writers
Brojomohun College alumni
University of Calcutta alumni
Academic staff of the University of Calcutta
 Writers from Kolkata
Novelists from West Bengal
People from Dinajpur District, Bangladesh